The Bible Translator is a peer-reviewed academic journal relating to theory and practice of Bible translation.

Since the foundation in 1950, it has appeared in two series - Technical Papers in January and July, and Practical Papers in April and October. Beginning with the April 2013 issue, TBT is currently published every four months, in a unique serie of papers, both practical and technical.

The Bible Translator is a member of the Committee on Publication Ethics

Abstracting and indexing 
The journal is abstracted and indexed in:
 Linguistics and Language Behavior Abstracts
 ATLA Religion Database
 Emerging Sources Citation Index

See also

 List of theology journals

References 

Biblical studies journals
English-language journals
Publications established in 1950
SAGE Publishing academic journals
Triannual journals